Abd ol Razzaq (also Romanized as ‘Abd ol Razzāq and ‘Abd or Razzāq) is a village in Baba Jik Rural District, in the Central District of Chaldoran County, West Azerbaijan Province, Iran. At the 2006 census, its population was 115, in 22 families.

References 

Populated places in Chaldoran County